John Frank may refer to:
 John Frank (epidemiologist) (born 1949), Canadian epidemiologist
 John B. Frank (born 1956), managing principal of Oaktree Capital Management
 John Frank (tight end) (born 1962), American football player
 John G. Frank (1831–?), Wisconsin legislator
 John Paul Frank (1917–2002), American lawyer and scholar
 John Frank (defensive end) (born 1974), gridiron football player

See also
 John Francis (disambiguation)
 John Franks (disambiguation)